α-Bungarotoxin is one of the bungarotoxins, components of the venom of the elapid Taiwanese banded krait snake (Bungarus multicinctus). It is a type of α-neurotoxin, a neurotoxic protein that is known to bind competitively and in a relatively irreversible manner to the nicotinic acetylcholine receptor found at the neuromuscular junction, causing paralysis, respiratory failure, and death in the victim. It has also been shown to play an antagonistic role in the binding of the α7 nicotinic acetylcholine receptor in the brain, and as such has numerous applications in neuroscience research.

Structure 
α-Bungarotoxin is a 74-amino-acid, 8 kDa α-neurotoxin with five disulfide bridges that binds as a competitive antagonist to nicotinic acetylcholine receptors (nAChRs). Like other snake venom α-neurotoxins, it is a member of the three-finger toxin protein family; its tertiary structure consists of a small globular core stabilized by four disulfide bonds, three projecting "finger" loops, and a C-terminal tail. The second loop contains an additional disulfide bond. The tips of fingers I and II form a mobile region that is essential for proper binding.

Hydrogen bonds allow for an antiparallel β-sheet, which keeps the second and third loops roughly parallel. The three-finger structure is preserved by four of the disulfide bridges: the fifth can be reduced without loss to toxicity. The fifth bridge is located on the tip of the second loop.

The multiple disulfide bonds and small amount of secondary structure seen in α-BTX is the cause of the extreme stability of this kind of neurotoxin. Since there are many entropically viable forms of the molecule, it does not denature easily, and has been shown to be resistant to boiling and strong acids.

Mechanism

α-neurotoxins antagonistically bind irreversibly to nAChRs of skeletal muscles, thereby blocking the action of ACh at the postsynaptic membrane, inhibiting ion flow and leading to paralysis. nAChRs contain two binding sites for snake venom neurotoxins. The observation that a single molecule of the toxin suffices to inhibit channel opening is in agreement with experimental data on the amount of toxin per receptor. Some computational studies of the mechanism of inhibition using normal mode dynamics suggest that a twist-like motion caused by ACh binding may be responsible for pore opening, and that this motion is inhibited by toxin binding.

Research applications

α-Bungarotoxin has played a large role in determining many of the structural details of the nicotinic acetylcholine receptors. It can be conjugated to a fluorophore or enzyme for immunohistochemical staining of fixed tissues and visualization via light or fluorescence microscopy. This application enables morphological characterization of the neuromuscular junctions.

See also 
 β-bungarotoxin
 κ-bungarotoxin

References

External links 
 
 Structure at GenBank

Ion channel toxins
Nicotinic antagonists
Vertebrate toxins
Bungarus
Neurotoxins